1605 Milankovitch, provisional designation , is an Eoan asteroid from the outer region of the asteroid belt, approximately 31 kilometers in diameter. It was named after Serbian scientist Milutin Milanković.

Discovery 

Milankovitch was discovered on 13 April 1936, by Serbian astronomer Petar Đurković at the Royal Observatory of Belgium in Uccle, Belgium. Two nights later, the body was independently discovered by Polish astronomers Jan Piegza and Tadeusz Banachiewicz at Cracow and Warsaw, respectively.

However, it remained unused – as did the subsequent observations at both Simeiz and Lowell Observatory in 1925 and 1931, respectively. The body's observation arc begins with its official discovery observation at Uccle in 1936.

Orbit and classification 

Milankovitch is a member of the Eos family, an orbital group of more than 4,000 asteroids, which are well known for mostly being of stony composition.

It orbits the Sun in the outer main-belt at a distance of 2.8–3.2 AU once every 5 years and 3 months (1,911 days). Its orbit has an eccentricity of 0.08 and an inclination of 11° with respect to the ecliptic.

Physical characteristics 

Milankovitch is classified as a metallic M-type by the NEOWISE mission, as a stony S-type by the Collaborative Asteroid Lightcurve Link (CALL), and as a LS-type – a transitional form between the common S-type and rare L-type asteroids – by Pan-STARRS1' large-scale survey.

Rotation period 

In April 2004, a rotational lightcurve of Milankovitch was obtained from photometric observations by American amateur astronomer Walter R. Cooney Jr. It gave a rotation period of  hours with a brightness variation of 0.12 magnitude.

Diameter and albedo 

According to the space-based surveys carried out by the Infrared Astronomical Satellite IRAS, the Japanese Akari satellite, and NASA's Wide-field Infrared Survey Explorer with its subsequent NEOWISE mission, Milankovitch measures between 27.8 and 33.8 kilometers in diameter and its surface has an albedo between 0.142 and 0.235. CALL derives an albedo of 0.140 and a diameter of 32.4 kilometers with an absolute magnitude of 10.2.

Naming 

This minor planet was named in memory of Serbian-Yugoslav scientist Milutin Milanković (1879–1958), best known for his Milankovitch cycles, a theory of celestial mechanics that describes the collective effects of changes in the Earth's movements upon its climate. He is also honored by the lunar crater Milankovič, and by the Martian crater Milankovič. The approved naming citation was published by the Minor Planet Center on 1 August 1980.

References

External links 
 Asteroid Lightcurve Database (LCDB), query form (info )
 Dictionary of Minor Planet Names, Google books
 Asteroids and comets rotation curves, CdR – Observatoire de Genève, Raoul Behrend
 Discovery Circumstances: Numbered Minor Planets (1)-(5000) – Minor Planet Center
 
 

001605
Discoveries by Petar Đurković
Named minor planets
19360413